Kinfolk is the only studio album by American hip hop duo Ali & Gipp, consisting of Ali Jones of St. Lunatics and Big Gipp of Goodie Mob. It was released on August 14, 2007 through Universal Motown. Production was handled by DJ Speedy, Stee, The Trak Starz, T-Wayne, Dallas Austin, Jay E, Jasper Cameron, Jermaine Dupri, Nitti and Trife. It features guest appearances from Nelly, Murphy Lee, Avery Storm, Big Rube, Bun B, CeeLo Green, Chocolate Tai, David Banner, Jasper Cameron, Juvenile, Kyjuan, LeToya Luckett, Lloyd, Tamala Jones and Three 6 Mafia. The album peaked at number 174 on the U.S. Billboard 200 chart.

The album was preceded by the single "Go 'Head" featuring Chocolate Tai. Three further singles were released from the album: "N da Paint" featuring Nelly, "Work Dat, Twerk Dat" featuring Murphy Lee and "Almost Made Ya" featuring LeToya Luckett.

Track listing

Charts

References

External links

2007 debut albums
Ali & Gipp albums
Collaborative albums
Universal Records albums
Albums produced by Dallas Austin
Albums produced by Jermaine Dupri